KFSE (106.9 FM) is a radio station licensed to serve Kasilof, Alaska.  The station is owned by KSRM, Inc. It airs a mainstream rock music format.

The station was assigned the KFSE call letters by the Federal Communications Commission on July 10, 2007. The station flipped to its current format on Thanksgiving Day, November 22, 2007.

KFSE is an affiliate of the syndicated Pink Floyd program "Floydian Slip."

References

External links
KFSE official website

FSE
Mainstream rock radio stations in the United States
Radio stations established in 2007